Hughes Peninsula is an ice-covered peninsula about  long, lying west of Henry Inlet on the north side of Thurston Island, Antarctica. At the northeast end of the peninsula is ice-covered Cape Davies. These features were plotted from air photos taken by U.S. Navy Operation Highjump in December 1946 and named by the Advisory Committee on Antarctic Names. The peninsula was named for Jerry Hughes, a photographer's mate with the U.S. Navy Bellingshausen Sea Expedition in February 1960, who took aerial photographs of Thurston Island from helicopters. The cape was named for Danny Davies, a social worker with the Byrd Antarctic Expedition in 1928–30.

Maps
 Thurston Island – Jones Mountains. 1:500000 Antarctica Sketch Map. US Geological Survey, 1967.
 Antarctic Digital Database (ADD). Scale 1:250000 topographic map of Antarctica. Scientific Committee on Antarctic Research (SCAR), 1993–2016.

References

Peninsulas of Ellsworth Land